Bichang may refer to:

Bichang (Qing dynasty official)
Zhou Bichang (born 1985), Chinese singer-songwriter
Buchinak-e Jadid, a village in Iran